Krenica Lake is a lake of Bosnia and Herzegovina locally known for its beauty.

According to a legend, it came into being in the same time as Red Lake and Blue Lake of Imotski, when God sank all property of a greedy rich man Gavan.

See also
List of lakes in Bosnia and Herzegovina

References

Lakes of Bosnia and Herzegovina